The European Athletics U18 Championships (named as European Athletics Youth Championships in 2016) are a biennial athletics competition for European athletes under the age of eighteen (youth category).

The creation of the competition stemmed from the 2013 European Athletics Congress. The event was created to promote the sport among young people in Europe. Each country may send a maximum of two athletes per event. The European U18 Championships will be the third age category championships organised by the European Athletic Association, following on from the long-running European Athletics U20 Championships (first held in 1970) and the European Athletics U23 Championships (first held in 1997).

The first iteration of the championships is set to take place in 2016. This will mean that the event will serve in the alternate years between the European Youth Olympic Festival, another biennial under-18s event hosted by the European Olympic Committees.

Editions

Championships records

Boys

Girls

All-time medal table 
Updated after 2022 European Athletics U18 Championships.

 Medals won by athletes competing as Authorised Neutral Athletes were not included in the official medal table.

References

External links
 European Athletic Association
 European Athletics U18 Championships – European Athletic Association

 
U18
Under-18 athletics competitions
Continental athletics championships
Biennial athletics competitions